Fredrik Modéus (born 19 October 1964 in Jönköping) is a Swedish theologian and bishop, currently the 59th Bishop of Växjö.

Priest
Modéus was ordained in 1991 for the Diocese of Växjö. After he served as vicar in Värnamo between 1991-1992. In 1992-1994, he served as a school chaplain in Hässleholm and between 1995-1996 as a school chaplain at Oskarshamns folkhøjskole. In 1996, Modéus moved to Lund and took office as a student clergyman, after which he served as supervisory director between 1997-1999 in the Helgealand Assembly. In 2000, he became a minister at the church of Helgeand in Lund. Between 2009-2014 he studied for a PhD at Lund University graduating in systematic theology on 13 May 2015 with his dissertation titled  The Worship Community in the People's Church (Gudstjänstgemenskap i folkkyrkan).

Bishop
In the spring of 2014, he was a candidate for the Bishopric of Lund, where he ended up in second place after Johan Tyrberg. In the autumn of the same year he once again took part in another election, this time for the bishopric of Växjö, where he ended up in the final round together with Thomas Petersson. On 3 December he was elected with 58% of the votes. On 12 April 2015 he was consecrated bishop in the Uppsala cathedral.

Personal life
Fredrik Modéus is the son of Adjuncts Nils Modéus and Ingrid Modéus, as well as brother of Archbishop of Sweden Martin Modéus and lawyer Daniel Modéus. Fredrik Modéus is married to the doctor Carina Modéus. Together they have three children.

References

1964 births
Living people
Swedish Lutheran bishops
21st-century Lutheran bishops
Swedish theologians
People from Jönköping